Rices Nachmans was an upscale department store chain that, at its peak, had eight locations in Norfolk, Virginia and the surrounding Hampton Roads area. Stores included Downtown Norfolk on Granby St. and Ward's Corner (opened 1952). The Wards Corner location was in the same building as a Hofheimer's shoe store. This building was demolished in 2000, and as of 2018, is the location of a Walgreens pharmacy.

The stores were converted to Hess's stores in 1985 after the chain was sold to Hess's by owner Phillips-Van Heusen.

References

Defunct department stores based in Virginia
Defunct companies based in Virginia